Ethnic hatred, inter-ethnic hatred, racial hatred, or ethnic tension refers to notions and acts of prejudice and hostility towards an ethnic group in varying degrees.  

There are multiple origins for ethnic hatred and the resulting ethnic conflicts. In some societies it is rooted in tribalism, while in others it originates from a history of non-peaceful co-existence and the resulting actual disputed issues. In many countries incitement to ethnic or racial hatred is a criminal offense. Often ethnic conflict is stoked by nationalist fervor and sentiments of national superiority—for which reason inter-ethnic hatred borders with racism, and often the two terms get conflated. 

Ethnic hatred has often been exploited and even fueled by various political leaders to serve their agenda of seeking to consolidate power or make electoral gains by calling for a united front against a common enemy (real or imaginary).

An example for ethnic hatred is the reported animosity toward the Romani people in Europe. The Romani people, also known as Gypsies are one of the marginalized and persecuted ethnic groups in Europe.

Role of media 
Media persuasion plays a role in dissemination of ethnic hatred. Media presence spreads underlying messages that negatively portrays certain ethnic groups to the eye of the public. For example, political elites use media exposure to influence the views of the viewers towards a certain propaganda. In 1930s Nazi Germany, media presence in exposing propaganda in terms of hatred was effectively organized by Joseph Goebbels. Although recent US data (Berelson, Lazarsfeld, and McPhee 1954; Lazarsfeld, Berelson, and Gaudet 1944) shows media as a tool that does not carry "significant independent influence," media "strengthens people’s predispositions." Furthermore, exogenous variation plays a role in utilizing media content towards escalating ethnic hatred presence according to recent economic studies. The effects of media on people varies in different platforms strengthening mass medias influence towards the public. Data polled from Muslim countries shows that exposure to Al-Jazeera is associated with higher levels of reported anti-Americanism in contrast to exposure to CNN associating with less anti-Americanism.

There are two types of persuasion: direct and indirect. Direct persuasion in regard to mass media exponentially expands hatred that leads to violence of ethnic groups. Indirect persuasion exports hatred and directs behavior towards executing violence.

The continuous use of mass media as an apparatus to spread negative image of ethnic groups is seen throughout variations of history. Most media hate speech that amplified worldwide attention are experienced in Rwanda and Yugoslavia. Also, media's control of hate speech that Nazi and fascist parties manipulate agitate and attract followers into advocating for hatred and violence. Today, social media plays a role in ethnic conflicts in Kenya. Ethnicity is a big part in determining voting patterns in Kenya; however, many associate ethnicity with grievances that mobilize patterns of differences, hatred, and violence.

Propaganda 

Along with mass media, propaganda plays as much role in distributing messages in terms of ethnic hatred. Propaganda is highly associated with totalitarian regimes in the twentieth century such as 1984 and Animal Farm by George Orwell that paved a way of commentating the regimes during the time.However, propaganda is dangerous when utilized negatively. In original meaning, propaganda promotes beliefs leading towards action.Alternatively, Jowett and O’Donnell define propaganda as ‘deliberate, systematic attempt to shape perceptions, manipulate cognitions, and direct behavior to achieve a response that furthers the desired intent of the propagandist’.The definition shows self-interested manipulation – an assumption that is difficult to prove. Negatively, propaganda presents “organised myth” that limits the chance of discovering the truth. The utilization of propaganda by Stalin, Hitler and Mussolini popularize the false impression of propaganda that hid the truth for an extended time.In addition, there are complex influences that emerged during the propaganda campaigns of the Great War (1914-18) and Russian Revolution (1917) such as telegraphs, newspapers, photography, radio, film, large corporations seeking new markets, rise of reform-minded journalism, and the influence of art movements, psychology, sociology, and marketing.The variation of propaganda and psychological warfare are essentially organized processes of persuasion.    

However, empirical research casts doubt on the role of propaganda in inciting hatred, finding that it is much less able to change minds than is often assumed. For example, a 2017 review of literature says: "First, propaganda often fails. To take the example of Nazi propaganda, it failed to generate support for euthanasia of the handicapped (Kershaw, 1983a; Kuller, 2015), it largely failed to turn people into rabid anti-Semites (Kershaw, 1983b; Voigtländer & Voth, 2015), it failed to generate much liking for the Nazi party (Kershaw, 1983b, 1987), and it soon failed to make Germans more optimistic about the outcome of the war (Kallis, 2008; Kershaw, 1983a; for similar examples regarding Stalinist propaganda, see Brandenberger, 2012; Davies, 1997; Maoist propaganda, see Wang, 1995; North Korean propaganda, see B. R. Myers, 2011).

See also
Ethnic cleansing
Ethnocide
Genocide
Hate crime
Racism
Religious hatred
World on Fire
Anti-Romany sentiment

References

Anti-national sentiment
Ethnic conflict
Racism
Prejudice and discrimination by type